Indiaroba is a municipality located in the Brazilian state of Sergipe. Its population was 18,149 (2020) and its area is 314 km².

References

Municipalities in Sergipe